Merillat Industries was founded in Adrian, Michigan as an American manufacturer of kitchen cabinets in 1946 by Orville D. Merillat. Now retired, Richard Merillat, took over from his father as CEO and President.

The Merillat Industries corporate headquarters, still located in Adrian, are on US-223 just outside the Adrian city limits. They had 11 manufacturing plants and over 4,200 employees in 2004 and have operated as an independent unit of Masco Corporation, a Detroit building products conglomerate since 1985.

In 2004 Merillat and Duncanville, Texas based QualityCabinets joined to form the Masco Builder Cabinet Group. In late 2007 Merillat Industries dissolved and began going by this new moniker.

On September 22, 2008, Masco announced that it plans to close the Adrian plant in early 2009, stating the following as its reason of closure:

Approximately 300 people will be without jobs when the plant closes.

In February 2010, the company announced a merger of the Adrian, Michigan-based Masco Builder Cabinet Group, and the Middlefield, Ohio-based Masco Retail Cabinet Group. The Retail Cabinet Group was most noted for producing the Kraftmaid, and Mills Pride cabinet brands. The new company that was formed has come to be known as Masco Cabinetry.

This new company is headquartered in Ann Arbor, Michigan at 4600 Arrowhead Drive. The company legally adopted its new name on January 1, 2011.

External links
Merillat.com

 
Manufacturing companies based in Michigan
Furniture companies of the United States
Manufacturing companies established in 1946
1946 establishments in Michigan
2010 mergers and acquisitions
Companies based in Ann Arbor, Michigan
Adrian, Michigan